Sylvie Genty (27 October 1955 – 15 or 16 December 2022) was a French actress and writer. She was active in dubbing and was known as the French voice of Sigourney Weaver. In 1996, she published the book La Palatine ou Les jours de rien.

Biography
Genty studied acting at the Conservatory of Nice from 1968 to 1970 and earned a role at the Centre dramatique de Nice-Côte d'Azur in a performance of Voltaire's Candide. She then studied at the Conservatoire national supérieur d'art dramatique from 1972 to 1976.

On television, Genty was best-known for her role as Maître Bataille in  alongside her husband, .

Sylvie Genty died in the 18th arrondissement of Paris on 15 or 16 December 2022, at the age of 67.

Filmography

Cinema
Betty (1992)
L'Aube insolite (2002)

Television
 (1981)
Tribunal (1990–1993)
 (1991)
 (1991)
 (2000)
 (2001)
 (2001)
 (2002)
 (2004)
Navarro (2004–2006)
Julie Lescaut (2005)
 (2010)
Profilage (2012)
 (2014)
 (2022)

References

1955 births
2022 deaths
French film actresses
French stage actresses
Actresses from Paris
French National Academy of Dramatic Arts alumni